Gmina Konopnica may refer to either of the following rural administrative districts in Poland:
Gmina Konopnica, Lublin Voivodeship
Gmina Konopnica, Łódź Voivodeship